The James B. Stephens House is the oldest house in Portland located in southeast Portland, Oregon, United States. The structure is listed on the National Register of Historic Places.

See also

 James B. Stephens
 National Register of Historic Places listings in Southeast Portland, Oregon

References

Further reading

1864 establishments in Oregon
Houses completed in 1864
Houses on the National Register of Historic Places in Portland, Oregon
Hosford-Abernethy, Portland, Oregon
Portland Historic Landmarks